The Kitchener–Waterloo Symphony (KWS) is an orchestra based in the twin cities of Kitchener and Waterloo, Ontario, Canada. Its home venue is Centre In The Square in Kitchener, Ontario.  The orchestra comprises 52 professional musicians under full-time contract. KWS performs close to 90 performances during a 38-week season for a combined concert audience of over 90,000. The orchestra is regularly heard across Canada on CBC Radio Two.  Its current music director is Andrei Feher since August, 2018.  The current executive director of the KWS is Andrew Bennett.

History 
Glenn Kruspe founded the orchestra in 1945 to accompany the Grand Philharmonic Choir in a concert, and served as its first music director from 1945 to 1960.  Frederick Pohl succeeded Kruspe and held the post from 1960 to 1970.  During Pohl's tenure, the KWS Youth Orchestra was established in 1966.  Raffi Armenian then became music director in 1971, and served until 1993, the longest-serving KWS music director.  During Armenian's tenure, a sister ensemble to the KUW, the Canadian Chamber Ensemble (CCE), was founded, formed mainly from the principal musicians of the KWS and included flute, oboe, clarinet, bassoon, two horns, two trumpets, trombone, tuba, percussion, two violins, viola, cello and bass.  The ensemble was affiliated with the Stratford Festival from 1974 to 1980, and toured throughout Canada as well as the United States Europe, and South America. The CCE was founded by conductor and was the first major Canadian ensemble to perform in Eastern Europe after the fall of the Berlin wall.  The KWS' current home hall, Centre In The Square, was built during Armenian's tenure.  Armenian now has title of music director laureate with the KWS.

Chosei Komatsu followed Armenian as music director from 1993 to 1999.  Martin Fischer-Dieskau held the post from 2001 to 2003.  His initial KWS contract had been for three years.  However, on 27 November 2003, the KWS board dismissed Fischer-Dieskau from his post, ahead of the expiration of his initial contract.  Fischer-Dieskau appealed for reinstatement, but the earlier dismissal was affirmed both in December 2003 and in April 2004.

In early October 2006, the KWS board announced that the orchestra would be forced to declare bankruptcy on October 31 unless it was able to raise another C$2.5 million to deal with an ongoing financial crisis,   due to declining audiences and reduced funding. It launched a "Save our Symphony" campaign in order to raise the funds. Having raised $2.3 million as of October 30, the symphony announced it would be able to continue operations.

Edwin Outwater began his term as Music Director in 2007. New programming initiatives during his tenure have included the 'Intersections' series, and collaborations with composers Mason Bates, Gabriela Lena Frank, Nicole Lizeé and Nico Muhly, authors Daniel Handler and Daniel Levitin, and rock musicians Dan Deacon and Richard Reed Parry.  In February 2014, the KWS announced the extension of Outwater's contract to 2017.  Outwater is scheduled to conclude his tenure at the end of the 2016-2017 season.  In March 2017, the KWS announced the appointment of Andrei Feher as its next music director, effective with the 2018-2019 season.

Music Directors
 Glenn Kruspe (1945–1960)
 Frederick Pohl (1960–1970)
 Raffi Armenian (1971–1993)
 Chosei Komatsu (1993–1999)
 Martin Fischer-Dieskau (2001–2003)
 Edwin Outwater (2007–2017)
 Andrei Feher (2018–present)

Discography
CBC Records has produced fourteen recordings of the KWS and the Canadian Chamber Ensemble (CCE) with acclaimed soloists. The 2002 CCE release, Chants d’Auvergne, includes soprano Karin Gauvin and was nominated for a Juno Award.

 Oktoberfest Operetta: Strauss - Lehár - Kálmán. M Boucher soprano, Dubois tenor, Armenian conductor. 1984. CBC SM-5045
 'Viens, Gentille Dame' Romantic Arias for Lyric Tenor. DuBois tenor, Pedrotti bar, Armenian conductor. 1987. CBC SM-5077
 Mahler Kindertotenlieder; Rückert Lieder; Songs of a Wayfarer. Robbin mezzo, Armenian conductor. 1989. CBC SMCD-5098
 A Night in Venice, Joanne Kolomyjec and Mark DuBois. 1994. CBC SM 5000. SMCD 5126
 Canadian Trumpet Concerti, works by Hetu, Forsyth, Nimmons, Guy Few, James Thompson, Dan Warren trumpet, Armenian conductor. 1994. CBC SM 5000. SMCD 5130
 Brahms: Serenades, Armenian conductor. 1995. CBC SM 5000. SMCD 5145
 Memories of Poland, Fialkowska, Armenian conductor, et al. 1995. CBC SM 5000. SMCD 5140
 Russian Serenade, Beaver, Komatsu conductor. 2001. CBC SM 5000. SMCD 5159

See also
 List of symphony orchestras
 Canadian classical music

References

External links
 Official website of the Kitchener–Waterloo Symphony
 History of the KWS from the official orchestra website

Culture of the Regional Municipality of Waterloo
Culture of Kitchener, Ontario
Canadian orchestras
Tourist attractions in the Regional Municipality of Waterloo
Musical groups established in 1971
1971 establishments in Ontario